Always a Bridesmaid is a 2019 American romantic comedy film directed by Trey Haley and starring Javicia Leslie, Jordan Calloway, Yvette Nicole Brown, Michelle Mitchenor, Richard Lawson, Brandon Micheal Hall, Telma Hopkins and Affion Crockett.

Cast
Javicia Leslie as Corina James-Randall
Jordan Calloway as Mark Randall
Yvette Nicole Brown as Pastor Althea Brody
Michelle Mitchenor as Tamara Mickens
Tosin Morohunfola as Bradley Mickens
Marcel Spears as Carlton Blakeston Jr.
Richard Lawson as Carlton Blakeston Sr.
Bernard David Jones as Terrence
Jasmin Brown as Denise Jenkins
Amber Chardae Robinson as Janelle Devereaux
Brandon Micheal Hall as Kenny
Telma Hopkins as Ruby
Affion Crockett as Dawson

Reception
Barbara Shulgasser-Parker of Common Sense Media awarded the film two stars out of five.

References

External links
 
 

American romantic comedy films
2019 romantic comedy films
2010s English-language films
2010s American films